The Tri-National Tornado Training Establishment (TTTE) was a multinational air unit based at RAF Cottesmore in Rutland, England, from 1981 to 1999. It performed training on the Panavia Tornado for the Royal Air Force (RAF), Luftwaffe, Marineflieger and Italian Air Force. Initially, pilots received four weeks of training on the ground, followed by nine weeks in the air.

History

The Tornado was first shown to the British public on 14 April 1978 at RAF Boscombe Down. The RAF planned to buy 220 of them, and 165 of the ADV variant. 809 for all three countries had been ordered, with 212 for the German Air Force, 112 for the German Navy and 100 for the Italian Air Force. Cost at that time was £7.8m for the GR1 and £9.4m for the ADV. As a historical comparison, a Tornado could carry twice the bomb load of an Avro Lancaster. It was chosen above contemporary American aircraft at that time because the General Dynamics  F-16 Fighting Falcon lacked all-weather capability, the McDonnell Douglas F-15 Eagle had inferior radar and electronic countermeasures and the Grumman F-14 Tomcat was too expensive. The Tornado was the first RAF aircraft with an active scanning Terrain Following Radar (TFR). The Marineflieger was the first to receive their aircraft. When the TTTE was established, the RAF was concerned it may not have enough trained pilots to fly the aircraft, due to poor recruitment and perceived low pay.

Formation
The memorandum of understanding establishing the unit was signed in 1979 by the United Kingdom, Germany and Italy and the unit came into existence on 29 January 1981 with Sir Michael Beetham in attendance. The first RAF Tornados arrived at the base on 1 July 1980; Luftwaffe Tornados arrived on 2 September 1980; and Italian Tornados arrived much later on 5 April 1982.

Structure

Allocation of aircraft was Germany: 23, UK: 19, and Italy: 6. Flying training began on 5 January 1981. It was manned by personnel of all three participating nations, trained 300 crews a year when at its height and consisted of three squadrons of Tornados.

TTTE was a unit of approximately 1,600 military and 130 civilian employees. The Royal Air Force provided technicians and logistics personnel, the staff and the three training squadrons were manned by the three nations. The post of the Wing Commander varied between the three nations.

Units
Staff and students of the three squadrons (Tornado Operational Conversion Unit – TOCU) were tri-nationally mixed. A-Squadron was headed by a German, B-Squadron by a British and C-Squadron by an Italian squadron commander.

Standardization Squadron (S-Squadron) was responsible for follow-on training, training of instructor pilots and conducting check flights. Theory lessons and simulator training was conducted by Ground School.

Funding
Cost sharing followed the ratio of flown sorties: 40:40:20 (Germany/Great Britain/Italy).

Closure

In the post-Cold War era and the growing differences in the aircraft variants, the three nations decided that they would be better served performing their own type training. There was also a need to find space for British aircraft returning to the UK from Royal Air Force Germany bases, such as RAF Bruggen, that were closing. Consequently, the unit disbanded on 24 February 1999, with Tornado flying ending on 31 March 1999.

After TTTE, Cottesmore became the base for Joint Force Harrier. The station housed all the operational Harrier GR9 squadrons in the Royal Air Force, and No. 122 Expeditionary Air Wing.  In April 2012 RAF Cottesmore was transferred to the British Army and renamed Kendrew Barracks.

Precedent for other training establishments
While the Eurofighter project has followed the example of the Tornado programme in many ways, the TTTE model was not adopted. Rather the Eurofighter partners (Germany, Italy, Spain and United Kingdom) have chosen to run national training schemes.

See also 

 List of Royal Air Force units & establishments

References

Bibliography

Aviation in Europe
Aviation schools in the United Kingdom
Education in Rutland
Military history of Rutland
Military units and formations established in 1981
Military units and formations disestablished in 1999
Multinational air units and formations
Organisations based in Rutland
Training establishments of the Royal Air Force